{{DISPLAYTITLE:C12H8N4O6S}}
The molecular formula C12H8N4O6S (molar mass: 336.28 g/mol, exact mass: 336.0165 u) may refer to:

 NBQX (2,3-dioxo-6-nitro-7-sulfamoyl-benzo[f]quinoxaline)
 Nifurzide